John Stedronsky (June 12, 1850 – May 11, 1924) was an American third baseman in Major League Baseball for the 1879 Chicago White Stockings. He was the first Austrian in the history of Major League Baseball.

Stedronsky was born in Bohemia, Austrian Empire on June 12, 1850, and his family emigrated to the United States in 1852. He married and had five children. Stedronsky suffered a stroke and died on May 11, 1924. He was buried at Woodland Cemetery in Cleveland, Ohio.

External links

Major League Baseball third basemen
Chicago White Stockings players
19th-century baseball players
1850 births
1924 deaths
Burials at Woodland Cemetery (Cleveland)
Austrian Empire emigrants to the United States
American people of Czech descent